"Alegría" is a pop song by Cirque du Soleil (from their show of the same name), which was recorded in 1994 with the voice of Francesca Gagnon.

The song is a multi-lingual adaptation (in English, Italian and Spanish) of another Cirque du Soleil song titled "Un pazzo gridar", written by René Dupéré and Franco Dragone and featuring Italian-only lyrics. "Un pazzo gridar" is also a song from the show Alegría. 

In 1999, Cirque du Soleil recorded a new version of the song for their film "Alegría, the Film". This new version was also included in the soundtrack of the movie, and received a Genie Award nomination for Best Original Song at the 20th Genie Awards.

In 2006, Cirque du Soleil recorded a new multi-lingual adaptation (in English, Portuguese and Spanish) titled "La nova alegría" for their arena show Delirium. This new adaptation was written by René Dupéré, Robert Dillon, Franco Dragone, Paolo Ramos and Manuel Tadros.

Adaptations 
"Alegría" was adapted in Hungarian by Ibolya Oláh under the title "Magyarország" ("Hungary") and in Finnish by Katri Helena under the title "Minä toivon" ("I Hope").

References

1994 singles
1994 songs
Cirque du Soleil